The J platform series are platforms developed by Hyundai and Kia for its range of compact (C-segment) automobiles since 1995.

J2 platform 
 Hyundai Elantra (RD/RD2) (1995–2000)
 Hyundai Tiburon/Coupe (RD/RD2) (1996–2000)

J3 platform 
 Hyundai Elantra/Avante (XD) (2000–2006)
Hyundai Matrix/Lavita (FC) (2001–2010)
 Hyundai Tiburon/Coupe II (GK) (2001–2008)
 Hyundai Tucson (JM) (2004–2009)
 Kia Cerato/Spectra (LD) (2004–2009)
 Kia Sportage (JE) (2004–2010)
 Kia Carens/Rondo (UN) (2006–2013, hybrid between J3 and Y5 platforms)

J4 (HD) platform 
 Hyundai Elantra/Avante (HD) (2006–2010)
 Hyundai i30 (FD) (2007–2011)
 Kia Cee'd (ED) (2006–2012)
 Kia Forte/Cerato (TD) (2008–2013)

J5 platform 
 Hyundai Elantra/Avante (MD) (2010–2016)
 Hyundai i30/Elantra GT (GD) (2011–2017)
 Hyundai Veloster (FS) (2011-2018)
 Kia Carens/Rondo (RP) (hybrid J5/Y6 platform) (2012–present)
 Kia Cee'd (JD) (2012–2018)
 Kia Forte/Cerato (YD) (2012–2018)
 Kia Soul (PS) (2014–2019)

J6 platform 

 Hyundai Elantra (AD) (2015–2020)
 Hyundai Veloster (JS) (2018–present)
 Kia Forte/Cerato (BD) (2018–present)

Eco-Car platform 

Hyundai Ioniq (AE) (2016–present)
Hyundai Nexo (FE) (2018–present)
Kia Niro (DE) (2016–present)

References

J